Katrin Kohv (born 8 February 1964 in Tallinn) is an Estonian actress.

In 1986 she graduated from Tallinn State Conservatory Stage Art Department. 1986-1990 she worked at Ugala Theatre and 1990-1993 at Vanalinnastuudio. Besides theatrical roles she has also played on several films.

Award:
1984: Voldemar Panso award

Selected filmography

 1983 Nipernaadi (role: Ello)
 1984 Lurich (role: Hotel maid)
 1989 Äratus (role: Vennaru Linda)
 1990 Ainult hulludele ehk halastajaõde  (role: Leida)

References

Living people
1964 births
Estonian film actresses
Estonian stage actresses
Estonian television actresses
20th-century Estonian actresses
21st-century Estonian actresses
Estonian Academy of Music and Theatre alumni
Actresses from Tallinn